Saek may refer to:
the Saek people
the Saek language